Gigli is a 2003 American romantic comedy crime film written and directed by Martin Brest and starring Ben Affleck, Jennifer Lopez, Justin Bartha, Al Pacino, Christopher Walken, and Lainie Kazan.

Despite popular media giving attention and interest to the film during production (primarily because stars Affleck and Lopez were romantically involved at the time), Gigli was heavily panned, and, in the years since release, it has been considered one of the worst films of all time. It was also one of the most expensive box-office bombs in history, grossing $7.2 million against a $75.6 million budget. To date, it is the most recent film Brest directed.

Plot 
Larry Gigli is a low-ranking Los Angeles mobster who is not nearly as tough as he likes to act.  Louis, a higher-ranking member of Gigli's organization, commands him to kidnap the mentally challenged younger brother of a powerful federal prosecutor to use as a bargaining chip to save New York-based mob boss Starkman from prison.

Gigli successfully convinces the young man, Brian, to go off with him by promising to take him "to the Baywatch", apparently a reference to the television show of that name, which seems to be Brian's singular obsession. Louis does not trust Gigli to get the job done right, so he hires a woman calling herself Ricki to take charge.

Gigli is attracted to Ricki, but he resents both Louis' lack of faith in him and having to take orders from a woman. He is also frustrated by Brian's insistence on going to "the Baywatch" and by the fact that Ricki is a lesbian. A suspicious detective comes to the apartment to question Gigli in reference to Brian's disappearance. He is further annoyed when his mother immediately bonds with Ricki and they team up to needle him.

Events take a darker turn when Gigli and Ricki receive orders to cut off Brian's thumb, something neither wants to do. Worse, her ex-girlfriend, Robin, shows up at the apartment, accusing Ricki of changing sexual orientation. Robin attempts suicide by self-mutilation and is rushed to the hospital, where she survives. There, Gigli sneaks into the morgue and cuts off a corpse's thumb, which he sends to the prosecutor as Brian's. Gigli and Ricki go back to his apartment, where he confesses his love and they sleep together.

They are summoned to meet with the mob boss. Starkman reveals that he did not approve of the plan to kidnap a federal prosecutor's brother or cut off Brian's thumb. He nevertheless rages at them because it didn't match Brian's fingerprint, and therefore not only failed to increase pressure on the prosecutor but even undermined their credibility.

Starkman then kills Louis, in retaliation for the kidnapping and associated scrutiny by law enforcement. He is about to kill Ricki and Gigli, but she talks him out of it. She points out that only they know where Brian is and only they can silence and prevent him from revealing Starkman's organization's involvement in the kidnapping.

They leave Starkman's, decide to leave the mob, and discuss taking Brian back to where they found him. On the way, they discover a Baywatch-like music video filming on the beach. Brian begs to be let off there and finally, they consent.

Gigli convinces Ricki to take his car to escape to parts unknown; but at the last minute, she returns to pick him up, and they leave town together.

Cast 
 Ben Affleck as Larry Gigli
 Jennifer Lopez as Ricki/Rochelle
 Justin Bartha as Brian
 Lainie Kazan as Mrs. Gigli
 Al Pacino as Starkman
 Lenny Venito as Louis
 Christopher Walken as Detective Stanley Jacobellis
 Missy Crider as Robin
 Terrence Camilleri as Man in Dryer

Production 
Halle Berry was invited as the female lead before dropping due to scheduling conflicts with X2, being replaced with Jennifer Lopez, who signed in late 2001 for a reported $12 million.

Gigli began shooting in Los Angeles on December 10, 2001. The original ending featured Gigli being killed, but after negative response to a test screening, the ending was re-shot and re-edited.

Release and reception

Critical reception 
On Rotten Tomatoes, Gigli has an approval rating of 6% based on 187 reviews with an average rating of 3.10/10. The site's critical consensus reads, "Bizarre and clumsily plotted, Gigli is a mess. As for its stars, Affleck and Lopez lack chemistry." On Metacritic, the film has a score of 18 out of 100 based on 37 critics, indicating "overwhelming dislike". Audiences polled by CinemaScore gave the film an average grade of "D−" on an A+ to F scale.

On Ebert and Roeper, critics Roger Ebert and Richard Roeper both gave the film thumbs down, although Ebert showed some sympathy towards the film, stating it had "clever dialogue", but was "...too disorganized for me to recommend it". Roeper called the film "a disaster" and "one of the worst movies I've ever seen". He then included Gigli on his 100 worst films of the decade at #7.

Ebert and James Berardinelli were two of the very few major critics to not write it off completely. Ebert gave the film two and a half stars out of four and made the balanced observation that "the movie tries to do something different, thoughtful, and a little daring with their relationship, and although it doesn’t quite work, maybe the movie is worth seeing for some scenes that are really very good." He also considered Lopez and Affleck "appealing in their performances" and that they "have chemistry" together. Berardinelli gave it two stars, saying, "This isn't a good film, but, when set alongside the likes of Dumb and Dumberer and Legally Blonde 2, Jen & Ben offer less pain."

Joel Siegel of Good Morning America awarded the film with a "D" rating and stated in his review "To qualify as a historic failure, a film needs a measure of pretension and all Gigli ever wanted to be was a romantic comedy. What it is is a dreadful romantic comedy."

Entertainment Weeklys Owen Gleiberman gave the film a "C+", stating "A watchable bad movie, but it's far from your typical cookie-cutter blockbuster. There are no shoot-outs or car chases, and there isn't much romantic suspense, either."

One of the few positive reviews came from Amy Dawes of Variety, who wrote that the story was ludicrous and that the film would tank, but that on balance she found it a fun film with several good performances.

In recent years, the movie has increasingly been re-evaluated by critics. For example, Jason Bailey in a piece for the Guardian, notes that "in the 21st century, the mixed review has become an endangered species – most readers look for the Rotten Tomatoes rating and pull-quote, and little beyond that. Everything is the absolute holy-shit best or the godawful worst of all time, and there’s nothing in between. Gigli is in between."

Box office 
Gigli grossed $3,753,518 in its opening weekend from 2,215 theaters averaging $1,694 per theater and ranking #8 at the box office.  The negative response led the studio to pull the advertisement for the film and replace them with another of their releases, Bad Boys II. The film set a record to date (2003) for the biggest second-weekend drop in box office gross of any film in wide release since that statistic was kept; it dropped by 81.9% in its second weekend compared to its first, grossing $678,640.  By its third weekend in release, only 73 US theaters were showing it, a 97% drop from its first weekend. The film ultimately earned $6,087,542 domestically and $1,178,667 internationally for a total of $7,266,209 on a $75.6 million production budget.

After its third week it was withdrawn, one of the shortest circulation times for a big-budget film. In the United Kingdom, the film was dropped by virtually every cinema after critics panned it. Gigli was stated to be a major part in Sony Pictures losing $42 million in the quarter of its release, even though the studio had the successful Bad Boys II and S.W.A.T. during the same period.  The worldwide gross of $7.7 million against a $75.6 million budget made Gigli one of the most expensive box office flops of all time.

Awards and nominations

Legacy 
Its title was named by the Global Language Monitor as one of the top words from Hollywood having an impact on the English language in 2003. Late night talk show hosts in particular lampooned the film in their monologues; Conan O'Brien said "The Mets are doing so badly that they will be renamed 'The New York Gigli.'"

Yahoo! Movies rates Gigli number one on their Bottom Rated Movies of All Time, with a critics' rating of D−. The Onion, a satirical newspaper, ran an article about the film, titled "Gigli focus groups demand new ending in which Affleck and Lopez die."

"Weird Al" Yankovic's song "Virus Alert" from the album Straight Outta Lynwood includes the line "make your TV record Gigli" as one of the negative effects of the titular virus.

In May 2015, The Hollywood Reporter named Gigli #25 on its list of "50 Worst Movie Titles of All Time".

In a 2013 episode of Saturday Night Live, Fred Armisen plays Iranian President Mahmoud Ahmadinejad performing as Affleck in a movie parodying the creation of Argo while Affleck is a member of the filming crew. When asked why he would appear in this film, he responded "I wanted to make a film worse than Gigli".

See also 
 List of films considered the worst

References

External links 
 
 
 
 
 

2003 films
2003 romantic comedy films
2000s American films
2000s crime comedy films
2000s English-language films
American crime comedy films
American romantic comedy films
Columbia Pictures films
Films directed by Martin Brest
Films scored by John Powell
Films set in Los Angeles
Films shot in Los Angeles
Golden Raspberry Award winning films
Mafia comedy films
Revolution Studios films
Romantic crime films